Tamyan-Taymas (Tamyan-Taymaś) is a rural locality (a selo) in Bogdanovsky Selsoviet, Miyakinsky District, Bashkortostan, Russia. The population was 516 as of 2010. There are 7 streets.

Geography 
Tamyan-Taymas is located 27 km west of Kirgiz-Miyaki (the district's administrative centre) by road. Ziriklykul is the nearest rural locality.

References 

Rural localities in Miyakinsky District